Paul Laciga (born 24 November 1970 in Bern) is a beach volleyball player from Switzerland, who won the silver medal in the men's beach team competition at the 2005 Beach Volleyball World Championships in Berlin, Germany, partnering Sascha Heyer. He represented his native country at two consecutive Summer Olympics, starting in 2000 (Sydney, Australia).

Laciga and his younger brother Martin (born 1975) teamed from 1995 through 2004 to place fifth in two Olympics (Sydney 2000 and Athens 2004) while competing together in four FIVB World Championships (1997, 1999, 2001 and 2003) and the 1998 Goodwill Games in New York City.  The Swiss brothers won six international gold medals (five SWATCH titles and a 1997 FIVB Challenge crown in the Czech Republic).

Laciga earned FIVB World Championship silver medals with his brother in 1997 in Marseille, France, and with Sascha Heyer in 2005 at Berlin.  Sandwiched between bronze (1997 Italy) and silver medal finishes (2001 Italy, and 2002 Switzerland), the Lacigas captured three-straight European continental championships (1998 Greece, 1999 Majorca and 2000 Spain).

Playing partners
 Sascha Heyer
 Martin Laciga

References

 Homepage about Paul Laciga
 Homepage about Paul Laciga's new business

External links
 
 

1970 births
Living people
Swiss beach volleyball players
Men's beach volleyball players
Beach volleyball players at the 2000 Summer Olympics
Beach volleyball players at the 2004 Summer Olympics
Olympic beach volleyball players of Switzerland
Sportspeople from Bern
Competitors at the 1998 Goodwill Games